Yellow dog may refer to:

Animals 
 Yellow Dog or Carolina Dog, wild dog variety in the southern United States
 Nureongi, a Korean dog
 A dog of any breed with a yellow coat of fur

Arts

Literature
 Yellow Dog (novel), 2003 novel by Martin Amis
 Old Yeller, novel about a yellow dog
 Yellow Dog (comics), an underground comix
 Yellow Dog, a fictional dog from the Blinky comic strip in The Dandy
 Yellow Dog Dingo, a character in Rudyard Kipling's Just So Stories

Music
 Yellow Dog (album), a 2007 album by Greg Brown
 Yellow Dog (band), 1970s band, who charted in the UK with "Just One More Night"
 Yellow Dog (bootlegger), publisher of bootleg records
 Yellow Dog Records, a Memphis music label named after the railroad
 The Yellow Dogs, rock band from Tehran, Iran

Other uses
 Yellow Dog (Variety), a Swedish variety show by Hasseåtage
 Far from Home: The Adventures of Yellow Dog, 1995 family film starring Jesse Bradford

Other 
 Yellow Dog, ring name of professional wrestler Brian Pillman
 Yellow dog, a Ku Klux Klan hazing ritual

See also
 Yellow-dog contract, an agreement between an employer and an employee regarding labor unions
 Yellow dog Democrats, American political term for Democratic voters in Southern states; also called "Yaller Dog"
 Yellow Dog Linux, Linux distribution by Terra Soft Solutions
 Yellow Dog Railroad, a common blues nickname for the Yazoo & Mississippi Valley Railroad, located in the Mississippi Delta